The 2020 cycling season for  began in January at the Tour Down Under in Australia.

2020 roster

Riders who joined the team for the 2020 season

Riders who left the team during or after the 2019 season

Season victories

National, Continental and World champions

References

External links
 
 

Bora-Hansgrohe
Bora–Hansgrohe
2020 in German sport